Montenegro competed at the 2012 European Athletics Championships held in Helsinki, Finland, between June 27 to July 1, 2012. 3 competitors, 2 men and 1 woman took part in 3 events.

Results

Men
Field events

Women
Field events

References
 

2012
Nations at the 2012 European Athletics Championships